Ali Al-Sqoor (born 24 November 1986) is a Saudi football player who plays for Hubuna as a defender .

External links
 

1986 births
Living people
Saudi Arabian footballers
Najran SC players
Al-Ahli Saudi FC players
Al-Taawoun FC players
Al-Jabalain FC players
Al-Mujazzal Club players
Hubuna FC players
Saudi First Division League players
Saudi Professional League players
Saudi Second Division players
Saudi Fourth Division players
Association football defenders